Ricardo Alcantara Vieira commonly known as Rico Vieira or Ricardinho is a Brazilian grappler, a Brazilian Jiu-Jitsu Instructor, and Competitor. He was born on the 9th of January 1979.
He is one of the Viera brothers (Léo and Leandro), who lead and fight for Checkmat.

Early life
Ricardo first stepped on a jiu-jitsu mat at the age of 5, joining the kids class of  IBJJF Hall of Fame coach Romero Cavalcanti (Jacaré). 
Vieira also played football (soccer) at a high level, making the junior squad of the famous Rio de Janeiro club Flamengo, though an injury kept him from progressing further in this activity.

Brazilian Jiu-Jitsu
Since beginning training at the age of 5, Vieira's aptitude for BJJ shone through right from the get go. He won multiple won in the junior leagues, including the World Jiu-Jitsu Championship, a competition in which he won in every belt division he competed, from Blue Belt to Black Belt.  He won the IBJJF World Championship as a black belt in 2001. In 2009 Ricardo made a reappearance to a BJJ competition in Stockholm, Sweden, winning the absolute division in the Stockholm BJJ Open. He also made another appearance in 2011 at the Brazilian National No-Gi Championship where he won the Master’s division as a lightweight.

CheckMat Jiu-Jitsu Team

One of the most successful teams in contemporary Brazilian Jiu-Jitsu, CheckMat's worldwide headquarters is in Signal Hill, California. CheckMat was established in 2008 by Leo and his brothers. Since its creation, Checkmat has become one of the top teams in Brazilian Jiu-Jitsu. Team CheckMat is the 2008 and 2009 NoGi World Champion Team. Team Checkmat also came in first for the Brazilian Nationals (Gi) 2010 and Brazilian Nationals (No-Gi) 2010.

References

External links
Official Vieira Bros Web Site
Fight Zone Stockholm Website
Fight Zone USA Website
Fight Zone Malaysia Website
CheckMat Website
International Brazilian Jiu-Jitsu Federation Website
Impact MMA (Checkmat Singapore) website
BJJ Heroes

Living people
Brazilian practitioners of Brazilian jiu-jitsu
People awarded a black belt in Brazilian jiu-jitsu
Sportspeople from Rio de Janeiro (state)
1979 births

ja:アンドレ・ガウヴァオン